Pseudolaguvia virgulata is a species of catfish from the Barak River drainage in Mizoram, India.

References

Erethistidae
Catfish of Asia
Fish of India
Taxa named by Heok Hee Ng
Taxa named by Lalramliana
Fish described in 2010